Meale is an English surname. Notable people with the surname include:

 Alan Meale (born 1949), British politician
 Gerald Meale (born 1947), English cricketer
 Richard Meale (1932–2009), Australian composer
 Trevor Meale (1928–2010), New Zealand cricketer

English-language surnames